Kalmar Nation is one of thirteen student nations of Lund University in Sweden. It has 1,688 members and is thus the sixth-largest student nation in Lund.

History 
The nation was originally intended for students from the city of Kalmar. The first known date for its establishment was February 29, 1696 – some 30 years after the university had been founded – but it is not confirmed whether the nation was an independent nation up until around 1750. It is most likely that it often worked in cooperation with other nations, as Lund University did not have many students at the time.

In 1767 Kalmar Nation formally merged with the Östgöta Nation and Västgöta Nation to form the Götiska Nation. This remained the case until 1817, when the increase in students allowed Kalmar Nation to form its own society.

In 1897, Kalmar Nation held the Storaste Kroppkaka "Largest Kroppkaka" fest, celebrating this Swedish potato dish. It subsequently became one of the known attributes of the nation, and over the years at least 54 fests have been held. It is the oldest student order and ball in Lund.

The nation's party venues are not very big, which is reflected in several of the nation's slogans, such as "Kalmar Nation - a little crowded, a lot more fun", "Kalmar Nation - the nation with the little room and the big heart", "Kalmar Nation – Come as You Are”.

Kalmargården 
Kalmargården is a house in central Lund, behind Tomegapsgården, where most of the activities around the nation take place. The building was opened in 1952. Already on November 27, 1841, it was decided that Kalmar nation should acquire its own house. To get the money in order to build the house, a lottery was arranged where the highest prize was a car which was donated by a car dealer in Lund. A plot for 35,000 crowns (~538,000 crowns in 2021) was bought and on March 14, 1952, the foundation was laid for Kalmargården.

The house was designed by Hans Westman. He gained inspiration from Domprostgarden in Kalmar.  In 1991 the building was reconstructed. Today's Kalmargården stands at four floors consisting of 18 corridor rooms and 4 apartments.

Kalmar Västra 
On Måsvägen in western Lund, the Nation's second housing complex, Kalmar Västra (Kalmar West) is located. The building consists of four corridors with 10 rooms each, along with 12 apartments in various sizes.

Today 

Due to its smaller premises, there is no club space, making it the only nation to hold weekly pubs but no clubs. It is also the only nation open on Tuesday nights (Pub Ölkällaren) in addition to its Friday pub (Pub Kaggen).

It has 1,391 members and is thus the seventh-largest student nation in Lund.

Additional reading 
Detailed information and about the nation and its history is available in print from the nation office in Lund.

 
 Kalmar nation i Lund 1892–1917 – Vid hundraårsjubileet den 30 april 1917
 Kalmar nation i Lund – Porträttalbum 1917–1927
 Birgit Arfwidsson: Kalmar nation i Lund 1927–1962
 Forskare ser på framtiden - Rapport från en tvärvetenskaplig diskussionsserie (Kalmar nations småskrifter I, 1982)
 Folket i trähusen - Om fattigdom i samhällets utkanter under mellankrigstiden (Kalmar nations småskrifter II, 1986)
 Kalmar nation och studietidens problem 1950-1990 (Kalmar nations småskrifter III, 1990)
 Hänryckningens tid: studentminnen från en småländsk hemvist i Lund - Kalmar nation 300 år (Kalmar nations småskrifter IV, 1996)
 Storaste Kroppkakan 100 år (Kalmar nations småskrifter V, 1997)
 Studentrevolten i Lund 1968/69 - Universitetsledningens policy (Kalmar nations småskrifter VI, 2000)

External links 
  Kalmarnation.nu - Official site

References 

Nations at Lund University